The 2000–01 Irish League Cup (known as the Coca-Cola League Cup for sponsorship reasons) was the 15th edition of Northern Ireland's secondary football knock-out cup competition. It concluded on 24 April 2001 with the final.

Linfield were the defending champions after their third consecutive and sixth overall League Cup win last season; a 4–0 victory over Coleraine in the previous final. This season they went out in the semi-finals to Glenavon, who condemned Linfield to their first defeat in the competition for four years. Glentoran were the eventual winners, defeating Glenavon 1–0 in the final to lift the cup for the third time overall, and the first time since the 1990–91 competition 10 years earlier.

Preliminary round

|}

First round

|}

Quarter-finals

|}

Semi-finals

|}

Final

References

Lea
2000–01 domestic association football cups
2000–01